Serbs in Greece is a community of Greek nationals of ethnic Serb descent and Serbian-born Greek nationals. They number more than 15,000 people, while according to the 2001 census some 5,200 people born in Serbia have Greek citizenship.

Serbian heritage in Greece

Notable people

Anna Prelević
George Berovich
Branislav Prelević
Dragan Šakota
Dušan Šakota
Vladimir Janković, basketballer
Boban Janković
Dušan Vukčević
Milan Tomić 
Predrag Djordjević
Siniša Dobrašinović 
Milan Gurović
Marko Jarić, basketballer
Dušan Jelić
Vasos Mavrovouniotis, revolutionary
Đorđe Mihailović
Igor Milošević
Miroslav Pecarski
Dimitris Popovic
Radoslav Nesterović
Peja Stojaković, basketballer
Dragan Tarlać
Mitar Đurić

See also
Serbian diaspora
Greeks in Serbia
Greece–Serbia relations

References

Sources

Ethnic groups in Greece
Greece
Greece
Greece
Greece